Shane Edward Smeltz (born 29 September 1981) is a New Zealand Australian footballer. He plays as a striker for Guiseley AFC in the Northern Premier League, the 7th tier of English football.

Smeltz had spent much of his early career playing in Australia before moving to England where he played for two and a half seasons. He played mostly in the A-League from 2007 onwards, with the exception of brief stints with Gençlerbirliği in Turkey and Kedah FA in Malaysia. He ended his professional playing career with Indonesian team Borneo F.C., before returning to the sport at a semi-professional level.

Smeltz is the all-time second-highest goalscorer in the A-League and was the top-goalscorer for Gold Coast United. He scored 24 goals in 58 international appearances for New Zealand and played at the 2010 FIFA World Cup.

Early and personal life
Smeltz was born in Göppingen, West Germany to ethnic German parents with New Zealand citizenship. Six months later he moved to New Zealand. In November 1987, at the age of six, Smeltz moved to the Gold Coast in Queensland, Australia, where he pursued a career in football through the Queensland Academy of Sport and was brought up for the remainder of his adolescent years while holding a New Zealand visa. Smeltz was granted dual-citizenship at the age of 23, becoming a dual-citizen of New Zealand and Australia.  He attended Palm Beach Currumbin High School on the Gold Coast during his teenage years and was classmates with future professional surfers Mick Fanning and Joel Parkinson.

Smeltz lives in Sydney with his wife Nikki (who later became a federal election candidate for United Australia Party) and daughters Bonnie and Scarlett but spends the off season on the Gold Coast and still considers it to be his home.

Club career

In England 2005–07
Smeltz played for a variety of amateur and semi-professional Australian clubs before he played a brief five match spell for Mansfield Town in the English Football League Two in 2005. In the 2005–06 season, he played in 61 competitive matches for AFC Wimbledon, including 11 as a substitute, and scored 26 goals. He played the following season for Halifax Town in the Conference National.

Wellington Phoenix
Smeltz returned to New Zealand in 2007, signing a two-year deal with the Wellington Phoenix in the A-League. In his first season, he finished second in the Golden Boot race with nine goals from 19 appearances. In the 2008–09 season, Smeltz scored a record-equalling 12 goals for the A-League season proper, resulting in the A-League Golden Boot 2008-09 and also goal of the season for his winning strike against Melbourne Victory at Westpac Stadium in round 13. In 2008–09 season Smeltz was voted the A-League's best player and was awarded the Johnny Warren Medal.

Gold Coast United
In November 2008 the Phoenix lost its battle to retain Smeltz for the 2009 season as he signed a three-year deal with A-League expansion club Gold Coast United.

Smeltz scored nine goals on his Gold Coast United debut as Miron Bleiberg's men recorded a 12–1 victory in their inaugural outing, a friendly against Mudgeeraba SC.

On 8 August 2009, Smeltz scored his club's first goal in their first A-League game against Brisbane Roar. In the following week Smeltz scored an impressive four goals against North Queensland Fury, which included a penalty. Smeltz and Gold Coast recorded their first loss to the Newcastle Jets at the next round, notable for being the only game he had not scored a goal.

A week later, Smeltz rebounded from his club's first loss to help in the win against Sydney FC. In the process he added another two goals to his tally taking him to an outstanding 8 goals from 5 games, his single man goal count was greater than any other club's overall amount in the league.

With 19 A-League goals to his name, he was formerly the holder for most A League goals in a season.

Shandong Luneng
On 12 July 2010, after a stellar season with Gold Coast United, it was announced Smeltz had agreed to terms with Chinese club Shandong Luneng on a two-year contract subject to passing a medical. On 17 July 2010, it was announced that Smeltz had "changed his mind about China and decided to return home", just five days into his contract. There was some confusion after his decision to return home in regards to which club he was contracted to.

Shandong Luneng had paid the transfer fee to Gold Coast United, but a Football Federation Australia source confirmed that Gold Coast United had not dispatched Smeltz's International Transfer Clearance form, meaning Smeltz was therefore free to rejoin them without any possibility of an international tug-of-war over his services.

On 17 July 2010, Gold Coast United owner Clive Palmer publicly stated that he is "hopeful of retaining him for the coming season."

Gençlerbirliği SK
On 24 August, his overseas career was given a lifeline when he was signed by Turkish Süper Lig club Gençlerbirliği. Smeltz made his debut for the club in their 2–1 home win over Istanbul BB. Smeltz scored his first goal for the club in the 1–0 home win over Ankaragucu with a 45th-minute penalty.

Perth Glory
On 20 March 2011 it was announced that Perth Glory and Smeltz signed a three-year contract worth A$4.1 million with the A-League club as a marquee. In his second appearance in the League for Perth, he scored a brace to take him to 51 League goals in the A-League, becoming only the second player to have scored a half-century in the competition next to Archie Thompson. On 24 March 2012 he scored all 4 goals in a 4–2 win against Melbourne Victory.

Sydney FC
On 18 May 2014, it was announced that Smeltz would be parting ways with Perth Glory after three years at the club, to join Sydney FC on a one-year deal. After the 2014–15 season, Smeltz signed a 2-year contract extension with Sydney, taking him to the end of the 2016–17 season.

Kedah FA
On 12 July 2016, Smelz joined Malaysian Super League club Kedah FA. On 20 July 2016, he made his debut goal for Kedah, against T-Team in Malaysia Cup, scoring two goals.

Return to Wellington Phoenix
On 18 December 2016, Smeltz returned to New Zealand, signing with Wellington Phoenix until the end of the season.

Borneo FC
On 9 April 2017, Smeltz joined Indonesian club side Borneo in the Liga 1.

Return to Gold Coast United
Following an 18-year career, Smeltz retired from professional football on 11 February 2018.

He subsequently signed with NPL Queensland team Gold Coast United in January 2020.

Guiseley AFC
After returning to England for family and work, in January 2023 Smeltz signed for Guiseley AFC, a 7th-tier semi-professional club based in the Leeds suburb of Guiseley.

International career
Smeltz has played for the under-20, under-23 and senior New Zealand national teams. He scored his first goal for the All Whites, an away friendly on 25 April 2006, against Chile. In that game Smeltz also became the first AFC Wimbledon player to win international honours, and the first to become an international goalscorer.

In May 2007, he was the scorer of both New Zealand goals in an impressive 2–2 draw against Wales.

On 19 November 2007, following his impressive form with Wellington Phoenix in the A-League and consistent performances for the All Whites, Smeltz was voted New Zealand footballer of the year, ahead of FA Premier League star Ryan Nelsen and Celtic striker Chris Killen. In December 2008, Smeltz was named Oceania federation player of 2007.

Smeltz travelled to South Africa as part of the New Zealand squad for both the 2009 Confederations Cup and 2010 World Cup Finals. He scored a goal at the latter against 2006 World Cup winners Italy in Nelspruit, making him the first ever A-League player to score in the World Cup Finals.

He was part of the New Zealand men's team at the 2012 Summer Olympics.

During a World Cup qualifying match against New Caledonia on 22 March 2013, Smeltz was the victim of a high boot to the face in the opposing penalty area, leaving him bloodied.

International goals
Scores and results list New Zealand's goal tally first.

International career statistics

Honours
Kedah FA
 Malaysia Cup: 2016

Individual
 Oceania Footballer of the Year: 2007, 2008
 Johnny Warren Medal: 2008–2009 with Wellington Phoenix
 A-League Golden Boot: 2008–2009 with Wellington Phoenix – 12 goals
 A-League Golden Boot: 2009–2010 with Gold Coast United – 19 goals
 NZF Men's Player of the Year: 2007
 Wellington Phoenix Player of the Year: 2007–08
 Wellington Phoenix Player's Player of the Year: 2007–08, 2008–09
 Wellington Phoenix Media Player of the Year: 2007–08, 2008–09
 Wellington Phoenix A-League Golden Boot: 2008–09
 A-League PFA Team of the Season: 2008–09, 2009-10
 PFA Team of the Decade (2005-2015)

See also
 New Zealand national football team
 New Zealand at the FIFA World Cup
 New Zealand national football team results
 List of New Zealand international footballers

References

External links
 
 
 
 
 
 

1981 births
Living people
People from Göppingen
Sportspeople from Stuttgart (region)
Association football forwards
New Zealand association footballers
New Zealand expatriate association footballers
New Zealand international footballers
Brisbane Strikers FC players
Napier City Rovers FC players
Adelaide City FC players
Adelaide United FC players
Mansfield Town F.C. players
AFC Wimbledon players
Halifax Town A.F.C. players
Wellington Phoenix FC players
Gold Coast United FC players
Gençlerbirliği S.K. footballers
Perth Glory FC players
Sydney FC players
Kedah Darul Aman F.C. players
Borneo F.C. players
A-League Men players
English Football League players
National League (English football) players
National Soccer League (Australia) players
Isthmian League players
Süper Lig players
Liga 1 (Indonesia) players
New Zealand people of German descent
Australian people of New Zealand descent
Australian people of German descent
Australian people of English descent
Naturalised citizens of Australia
New Zealand people of English descent
New Zealand emigrants to Australia
Expatriate footballers in England
Expatriate footballers in Turkey
New Zealand expatriate sportspeople in England
New Zealand expatriate sportspeople in Turkey
2003 FIFA Confederations Cup players
2004 OFC Nations Cup players
2008 OFC Nations Cup players
2009 FIFA Confederations Cup players
2010 FIFA World Cup players
2012 OFC Nations Cup players
Footballers at the 2012 Summer Olympics
2017 FIFA Confederations Cup players
Olympic association footballers of New Zealand
North Eastern MetroStars SC players
Footballers from Baden-Württemberg
Guiseley A.F.C. players
Northern Premier League players
Sportspeople from the Gold Coast, Queensland
Soccer players from Queensland